Molalla or Molala may refer to one of these Oregon-related articles:

 Molala people, a Native American tribe who traditionally lived near the Molalla River
 Molala language, the language spoken by the Molala people
 Molalla River, a river in Clackamas County
 Molalla, Oregon, a city named after the river
 Molalla Buckeroo, an annual rodeo held in Molalla
 Molalla Prairie, Oregon, an unincorporated area, designated as a hamlet, south of the city of Molalla